Sean Patrick Maloney (born July 30, 1966) is an American lawyer and politician who served as the U.S. representative from  from 2013 to 2023. The district includes Newburgh, Beacon, and Poughkeepsie. A member of the Democratic Party, Maloney ran for New York Attorney General in 2018, losing to Letitia James in the primary.

Born in Sherbrooke, Quebec, Canada, and raised in Hanover, New Hampshire, Maloney earned his Bachelor of Arts and Juris Doctor from the University of Virginia. He entered politics as a volunteer for Bill Clinton's 1992 presidential campaign and later served as his senior West Wing adviser and White House Staff Secretary.

Before being elected to Congress, Maloney worked as a software company executive and as an attorney. He was elected to the U.S. House in 2012, defeating Republican Party incumbent Nan Hayworth. He campaigned as a moderate and is a member of the centrist New Democrat Coalition. He is the first openly gay person elected to Congress from New York. He served as chair of the Democratic Congressional Campaign Committee from 2021 to 2023. In the 2022 election, he lost reelection in New York's 17th congressional district to Republican Mike Lawler.

Early life
Maloney was born on July 30, 1966, in Sherbrooke, Quebec, Canada, to American parents. His father's job as a lumberjack had temporarily brought them to Canada. Maloney grew up in Hanover, New Hampshire. He was raised with his six siblings in what he describes as a "small Irish Catholic family". Maloney graduated from Hanover High School in 1984.

After attending Georgetown University for two years, Maloney transferred to the University of Virginia, graduating with a Bachelor of Arts in international relations in 1988. He then spent a year volunteering with Jesuit priests in the slums of Chimbote, Peru, after which he returned to the U.S. and attended the University of Virginia School of Law, graduating with a Juris Doctor in 1992.

Early political career

Clinton administration
In 1991, Maloney began working on Bill Clinton's first campaign for president as deputy to chief scheduler Susan Thomases. In Clinton's 1996 reelection campaign Maloney worked as Director of Surrogate Travel. After Clinton was reelected, Maloney was offered a position in the White House staff and served as a senior advisor and White House Staff Secretary from 1999 to 2000, among the youngest to serve in that capacity. At a campaign event Clinton said that Maloney worked closely with him.

Following the killing of gay University of Wyoming student Matthew Shepard, Maloney was one of two representatives Clinton sent to his funeral. In an article about the event, a newspaper noted that Maloney often called himself "the highest-ranking openly homosexual man on the White House staff".

2006 attorney general election

Maloney ran for the Democratic nomination for New York Attorney General in 2006. According to Gay City News, his "competitive fundraising and wide travels across the state during the past year have impressed many party professionals with the seriousness of his run." During the campaign, Maloney was endorsed by the New-York-state-based gay rights organization Empire State Pride Agenda and Karen Burstein, the first lesbian to run for attorney general, in 1994.

Consistently polling in the single digits, Maloney was offered a chance to run for the office on the Liberal Party ticket but declined, saying he would support whoever won the Democratic nomination. Maloney finished third in the September 12 primary, with 9.4% of the vote. Former U.S. Secretary of Housing and Urban Development Andrew Cuomo won. In his concession speech, Maloney said, "[T]his day may not be the outcome we hope, but I make you a promise that there will be another day."

Secretary to the Governor
Maloney joined Governor Eliot Spitzer's administration in January 2007 as First Deputy Secretary under top adviser Rich Baum.

The Eliot Spitzer political surveillance controversy (popularly known as "Troopergate") broke out on July 23, 2007, when Cuomo's office admonished Spitzer's administration for ordering the State Police to create special records of Senate Majority Leader Joseph Bruno's whereabouts when he traveled with police escorts in New York City. A New York Times editorial suggested that Maloney might have been involved by withholding emails during the investigation, and the Times endorsed Maloney's 2012 election opponent because of its concerns about Maloney's handling of the investigation. The Wall Street Journal wrote in July 2012, "[G]enerally, those involved in the investigation on both sides defend Mr. Maloney's conduct. Mr. Cuomo's chief of staff at the time, Steve Cohen, called the idea that Mr. Maloney got in the way of the Attorney General's inquiry 'misinformed to the point of being laughable.'"

Maloney continued in the same role as a top adviser to Governor David Paterson's administration under his top adviser, Charles O'Byrne. While working for Paterson, Maloney worked on Paterson's effort to increase state aid to education. On December 3, 2008, Maloney announced that he would leave Paterson's office to join the law firm Kirkland & Ellis.

Private sector 
From 2000 to 2003, Maloney served as chief operating officer of Kiodex, Inc. He was a senior attorney at the law firm Willkie Farr & Gallagher, during which time he represented the Matthew Shepard Foundation. Maloney became a partner in the law firm of Kirkland & Ellis LLP in 2009. In March 2011 he joined the law firm Orrick, Herrington & Sutcliffe as a partner.

U.S. House of Representatives

Elections

2012

In March 2012, Maloney announced his intention to run for Congress in the 18th district. The district had previously been the 19th, represented by freshman Republican Nan Hayworth. Maloney won the Democratic primary on June 26 with 48% of the vote against four other challengers. In addition to the Democratic Party line, Maloney also ran on the Working Families Party ticket with New York's fusion voting.

Maloney drew criticism for buying a house in Cold Spring before the election, never having previously lived in the district. On June 11, Bill Clinton endorsed Maloney, saying "I support Sean because I know he'll be an outstanding member of Congress." On October 21, The New York Times endorsed Maloney, writing that his opponent "has favored limiting contraception coverage for employees and voted to defund Planned Parenthood. Mr. Maloney promises to support health care reform, help the middle class and oppose tax cuts for the rich. We recommend Mr. Maloney." Maloney also was endorsed by Planned Parenthood, the AFL–CIO and New York State United Teachers Union.

In the general election Maloney campaigned as a moderate and defeated Hayworth 52–48%. In his victory speech, Maloney said, "I think people want change in Washington. They're tired of the fighting and the bickering." Maloney is New York's first openly gay member of Congress.

2014

Maloney ran for reelection in 2014, again facing Hayworth. He was a member of the Democratic Congressional Campaign Committee's Frontline Program, designed to help protect vulnerable Democratic incumbents in the 2014 election. Maloney lost the Independence Party primary to Hayworth, but defeated her in the general election by under 3,000 votes, with 84,415 votes (47.58%) to Hayworth's 81,625 (46.01%).

2016

Maloney ran for reelection in 2016. Fellow Democrat Diana Hird announced her intention to challenge him in the primary election on June 28, 2016, but failed to obtain the necessary number of signatures and file a petition to get on the ballot in time. Maloney handily defeated Republican Phil Oliva, with 162,060 votes (55.6%) to Oliva's 129,369 (44.4%).

2018

In June 2018, Maloney became the Democratic nominee for reelection to the House. He was also a candidate for the Democratic nomination for attorney general of New York but lost the primary. He had said that, had he won the primary, he would have run for attorney general and relinquished the nomination for the House.

In the Democratic primary for attorney general, Maloney finished third. New York City Public Advocate Letitia James, who was endorsed by Governor Andrew Cuomo, won. Zephyr Teachout, a law professor endorsed by Senator Bernie Sanders and The New York Times, finished second. Maloney was endorsed by Beto O'Rourke, among other public figures.

Remaining on the ballot for the House election, Maloney defeated Republican James O'Donnell, an Orange County legislator, with 139,564 votes (55.5%) to O'Donnell's 112,035 (44.5%).

2020 
Maloney was reelected in 2020, with 54.8% of the vote to Republican nominee Chele Farley's 43.2%. On the day Maloney began his new term in Congress, January 3, 2021, he became chair of the Democratic Congressional Campaign Committee.

Tenure
On January 3, 2013, Maloney was sworn into the 113th United States Congress. On his second day in office, he spoke on the House floor, criticizing a delay in federal Hurricane Sandy aid and urging House Speaker John Boehner and his colleagues to pass an aid package.

After joining the "No Labels" Problem Solvers Caucus, Maloney supported the "No Budget, No Pay Act of 2013". Leading up to the 2013 government shutdown, he faced criticism for voting with Republicans to pass a budget that included provisions delaying the implementation of the Patient Protection and Affordable Care Act. His vote drew the ire of LGBT groups, some accusing him of being a "Democrat In Name Only" ("DINO"). He has been an outspoken critic of sequestration and the harmful effects it would have on the United States Military Academy at West Point, and he sent President Barack Obama and Secretary of Defense Chuck Hagel a letter asking for flexibility in his district. During the shutdown Maloney requested that his pay be withheld in solidarity with federal workers.

In April of his first year in office, Maloney introduced the Creating Reliability for Our Producers Act, the Dam Safety Act, and the Disabled Veterans Red Tape Reduction Act. In October 2013, the House passed the Disabled Veterans Red Tape Reduction Act with near unanimous support. The bill would allow disabled veterans to have their medical examinations performed by physicians outside the Veterans Affairs system.

In July 2013, Maloney voted against the Farm Bill. The bill failed in the House due largely to the votes of eight Democratic House members who joined the Republican majority.

On banking issues, Maloney voted in 2014 to repeal the section of Dodd-Frank that would prevent bank bailouts by the public. He voted for the Economic Growth, Regulatory Relief, and Consumer Protection Act in 2018; Elizabeth Warren nicknamed this bill the "Bank Lobbyist Act". Maloney called one opponent's characterization of the latter vote "unhinged", which earned him a rebuke for making remarks that could be considered sexist.

An issue in Maloney's first campaign for Congress was whether the candidates would vote to repeal the Defense of Marriage Act (DOMA); Hayworth was considered more progressive on gay rights than most Republicans, but did not explicitly say whether she would vote to repeal, saying her belief that the New York law allowing same-sex marriage made it a settled issue, for which Maloney criticized her. After the Supreme Court struck down provisions of DOMA, Maloney said at a press conference that he was "no longer seen as less-than in the eyes of my country", having previously faced discrimination in the House, with his partner not eligible for benefits while members' opposite-sex partners were.

On April 10, 2014, Maloney introduced the Human Trafficking Prevention Act (H.R. 4449; 113th Congress), a bill that would require regular training and briefings for some federal government personnel to raise awareness of human trafficking and help employees spot cases of it. The bill passed the House on July 23, 2014.

In July 2014, the FAA began an investigation into whether unmanned aircraft used for Maloney's wedding violated the agency's ban on drone flights. A spokesman for Maloney, who is a member of the House Transportation and Infrastructure Committee's aviation subcommittee, which oversees the FAA, acknowledged that drones were hired.

Maloney positioned himself as an opponent of President Donald Trump and his agenda, voting in support of that agenda 23.3% of the time as of December 2019. When that number was initially higher, he referred to that statistic as a "bullshit metric".

As of June 2022, Maloney had voted in line with Joe Biden's stated position 100% of the time.

In 2021, Maloney became the first openly gay person to be elected chair of the Democratic Congressional Campaign Committee.

In March 2021, Maloney called for New York Governor Andrew Cuomo's resignation.

In 2022, Maloney ran for reelection in a different congressional district, New York's 17th, and narrowly lost the general election to Republican Mike Lawler.

Committee assignments
Permanent Select Committee on Intelligence
Subcommittee on Counterterrorism, Counterintelligence and Counterproliferation
Subcommittee on Defense Intelligence and Warfighter Support
Committee on Agriculture
Subcommittee on General Farm Commodities and Risk Management
Subcommittee on Horticulture, Research, Biotechnology, and Foreign Agriculture
Committee on Transportation and Infrastructure
Subcommittee on Aviation
Subcommittee on Highways and Transit
Subcommittee on Water Resources and Environment

Caucus memberships
New Democrat Coalition
No Labels Problem Solvers
LGBT Equality Caucus, Co-Chair
Children's Health Care Caucus
Congressional Lupus Caucus
Congressional Arts Caucus
Congressional Autism Caucus
Congressional Task Force on Alzheimer's Disease
Congressional Anti-Bullying Caucus
CAN Caucus
House Hellenic Caucus
House Impact Aid Caucus

Personal life
Maloney has been with his husband, Randy Florke, since 1992; they met in New York City, where Maloney was helping plan the Democratic National Convention. Florke is an interior decorator who has been featured in O, The Oprah Magazine.

Maloney and Florke became engaged on December 25, 2013. They married in Cold Spring, New York, on June 21, 2014. Maloney became the second member of Congress to legally marry his same-sex partner while in office, the first being former Massachusetts Congressman Barney Frank in 2012.

Maloney and Florke have adopted three children; the family lives in Cold Spring.

Electoral history

U.S. House of Representatives

New York Attorney General

See also
 List of American politicians of Irish descent
 List of LGBT members of the United States Congress

References

External links

|-

|-

|-

1966 births
21st-century American businesspeople
21st-century American politicians
American chief operating officers
American LGBT businesspeople
American people of Irish descent
Anglophone Quebec people
Businesspeople from New York (state)
Candidates in the 2006 United States elections
Candidates in the 2018 United States elections
Democratic Party members of the United States House of Representatives from New York (state)
Gay politicians
Georgetown University alumni
People associated with Kirkland & Ellis
LGBT appointed officials in the United States
LGBT members of the United States Congress
LGBT people from New Hampshire
LGBT people from New York (state)
Living people
New York (state) lawyers
Orrick, Herrington & Sutcliffe people
People from Cold Spring, New York
People from Hanover, New Hampshire
Politicians from Sherbrooke
State cabinet secretaries of New York (state)
University of Virginia School of Law alumni
White House Staff Secretaries